Merrimac (formerly, Merrimack, Pea Vine, and Peavine) was an unincorporated community in Butte County, California located along Oroville-Quincy Road about  south of the Plumas County line at an elevation of 3999 feet (1219 m). Nearby is Rogers Cow Camp, a campground in Lassen National Forest.

The community was located along Oroville-Quincy Road between the towns of Buckeye and Junction House. As the name implies, the road continues to intersect with State Route 70 in Quincy. This road is also called Forest Service Road 119. It is shown on some modern road maps covering the entire state. Merrimac does not appear on the 1958 State of California highway map.

The Pea Vine post office operated from 1856 to 1864. The Merrimac post office operated from 1883 to 1902 and 1915 to 1934.

References

 Road Map of California, State of California, Department of Public Works, Division of Highways, 1958.

Unincorporated communities in California
Unincorporated communities in Butte County, California